= Sanfutie =

Procedure in traditional Chinese medicine

Sanfutie (三伏贴) is a procedure in traditional Chinese medicine in which medicated patches are placed on various acupuncture points on the body. Originating in the Qing dynasty, this method is based on the principle of 冬病夏治 (lit. winter disease, summer cure). As sanfu (三伏) is the hottest period on the Chinese calendar, it is considered a particularly suitable time for treating illnesses.

Typically, four of these credit-card-sized patches are applied to different locations on the back at the same time, and are kept there for several minutes (depends on the component of the patches).

== See also ==
- Allergic rhinitis : one of winter disease to be treated by Sanfutie
